Songwriter is a 1984 film directed by Alan Rudolph. At the 57th Academy Awards, it received an Oscar nomination for Best Original Song Score and Its Adaptation or Adaptation Score for Kris Kristofferson.

Genre
The film is a satirical comedy-drama about an artist seeking his freedom. The material is loosely based on Willie Nelson's own life and legend and finances. His song "Night Life", for example, which he sold in 1961 for $150, went on to be recorded by over 70 artists and sold more than 30 million copies.

Plot

Doc Jenkins (Willie Nelson) is a country and western composer, who employs devious tricks to extricate himself from his legal entanglement with a Nashville gangster entrepreneur who takes all the profits from his songs.

Fed up with life touring and making no money from recordings of his music, Doc has turned to managing the career of his old singing partner Blackie Buck (Kris Kristofferson). Doc takes a further client - a woman singer, Gilda (Lesley Ann Warren). He wants to get back with his ex-wife Honey (Melinda Dillon), and to get solid ground beneath his feet again.

Reception

The film is reviewed, favorably, by the critic Pauline Kael in her collection of movie reviews, Hooked. "Playing a vain, laid-back sensualist, the silver bearded Kristofferson has a smiling glow; he has never been more at ease; Rip Torn is the picture's insurance against gentility. Everything he says sounds mean and dirty, and even when you can't understand his snarled out words he makes you laugh. Rhonda Dotson has something of Teri Garr's manic alertness and dippiness, too, but in a softer form. She's a romantic comedienne with awesome poise. Richard C. Sarafian has a whomping comic menace. Lesley Ann Warren's Gilda is spectacular. When we first see Gilda, she's a singer with no belief in herself and no class; she's an incredibly beautiful girl in a red dress [but] when Doc grooms her to go out as the opening act for Blackie, she begins to learn something about taste and musicianship, and her voice flowers. Besides being one of the great beauties of the screen, Warren can sing."
Roger Ebert gave the film  out of a possible 4 stars, and says ""Songwriter" is one of those movies that grows on you. It doesn't have a big point to prove, and it isn't all locked into the requirements of its plot. It's about spending some time with some country musicians who are not much crazier than most country musicians, and are probably nicer than some. It also has a lot of good music."

References

External links
 

1984 films
1980s musical comedy films
American satirical films
Country music films
1980s English-language films
Films directed by Alan Rudolph
TriStar Pictures films
1984 comedy films
1980s American films